"Final Warning" is a song by American rapper NLE Choppa. It was released on April 30, 2021 with an accompanying music video and produced by Damn E. It is also the lead single from his third mixtape, Me vs. Me (2022).

Composition
The song was written by NLE Choppa and Elisner Joseph.
In the song, NLE Choppa warns his enemies of the "damage" he can cause. He raps, "Never send a threat on the internet just to prove a point / That dissin', don't get into that, we leavin' that to the informants / Don't inform me about who informing, that's yo' final warning / 7.62s sting like a Bumblebee, he start transforming".

Music video
The music video, directed by Krispy Kam and NLE Choppa himself, shows Choppa dancing with his friends and showing stacks of money. They are seen at a gas station and in a basement as well.

Charts

Certifications

References

2021 singles
2021 songs
NLE Choppa songs
Warner Records singles
Songs written by NLE Choppa